NGC 5034 is a spiral galaxy in the constellation of Ursa Minor. NGC 5034 is its New General Catalogue designation. It is located about 401 million light-years (123 Mpc) from the Sun. It was discovered on April 7, 1793, by William Herschel.

References

External links 

Spiral galaxies 
5034
45859
Ursa Minor (constellation)